Boma National Park is a protected area in eastern South Sudan near the 
Ethiopian border.

Wildlife
The park is an important refuge for white-eared kob, tiang,  and Mongalla gazelle. Other large mammals are buffalo, elephant, African leopard, Nubian giraffe, oryx, hartebeest, Northeast African cheetah, common eland, Lelwel hartebeest, maneless zebra, waterbuck, Grant's gazelle, Lesser kudu, bongo, Giant eland, and Nile lechwe. It is also an important bird area; avifauna includes Ruppell's vulture and the black-chested snake eagle. The neighboring Gambela National Park in Ethiopia protects similar species.

Since 2005, the protected area is considered a lion conservation unit together with Gambella National Park.

 White-eared kob
The most prominent species of the Boma National Park is the white-eared kob (Kobus kob leucotis) antelope. A UNEP study reports that the white-eared kob is found mostly to the east of Nile River in South Sudan within the clay plains and wetlands; though occurring in substantial numbers in the Boma National Park, it is reported to be found more outside the protected area. Its migration route and population during the summer and monsoon seasons have been recorded. In comparison to the wet season count of 680,716 in 1980 (849,365 in dry season), the UNEP survey of 2001 reported only 176,120 during the wet season (although the two studies are not directly comparable).

The wildlife in this park has provided bush meat, which is not only a dominant food need for many people of Southern Sudan, but also an avenue of illegal trading supported by wildlife hunting that has caused biodiversity damage. The park accounts for the greatest concentration of wildlife in the country, particularly of mammals.

References

Pibor Administrative Area
National parks of South Sudan
Protected areas established in 1986
1986 establishments in Sudan
Important Bird Areas of South Sudan